Charlotte Frances Riley (born 29 December 1981) is an English actress. She is known for her roles as Sarah Hurst in Easy Virtue (2008) and as Catherine Earnshaw in ITV's adaptation of Wuthering Heights (2009).

Early life and education
Riley was born in Grindon, Sunderland. She was brought up in Sunderland and attended Teesside High School from the age of 9 until 18. She attended St Cuthbert's Society, Durham from 2000 to 2003, performing with the sketch comedy group, the Durham Revue and in plays and musicals and graduating with a degree in English and Linguistics; she also attended the London Academy of Music and Dramatic Art from 2005 to 2007.

Career
In 2004, Riley won the Sunday Times' Playwriting Award for Shaking Cecilia, which she co-wrote with Tiffany Wood. In 2011, she played Anna in Helen Edmundson's adaptation of Anna of the Five Towns on BBC Radio 4. She appeared in Edge of Tomorrow, starring Tom Cruise and Emily Blunt. She also appeared onstage at the Royal Court Theatre production of The Priory, by Michael Wynne. She co-starred in London Has Fallen, the sequel to the 2013 film Olympus Has Fallen, where she portrayed an MI6 agent Jacqueline Marshall. She also portrayed Arabella Strange in the mini-series adaptation of Jonathan Strange & Mr Norrell. In 2018, she got a lead role in the BBC drama Press, which was cancelled after its first series. In 2019, Riley played the role of Lottie / Ghost of Christmas Present in the BBC mini-series A Christmas Carol, based on the Charles Dickens novella of the same name. She appeared in the Amazon Prime Video series The Peripheral.

Personal life

In 2010, she became engaged to English actor Tom Hardy. Riley and Hardy worked together on Wuthering Heights and The Take, and they married in July 2014. In October 2015, their first child was born. Riley had her second baby with Hardy in December 2018. Hardy has a son from a previous relationship.

Filmography

References

External links

1981 births
Alumni of St Cuthbert's Society, Durham
Alumni of the London Academy of Music and Dramatic Art
Living people
Actors from Stockton-on-Tees
Actors from County Durham
English television actresses
People educated at Teesside High School
21st-century English actresses
English stage actresses
English film actresses
English dramatists and playwrights